Rachael Joy Denhollander (née Moxon; born December 8, 1984) is an American lawyer and former gymnast. She was the first woman to publicly accuse Larry Nassar, the former Michigan State University and USA Gymnastics doctor, of sexual assault. Denhollander is 2018 Glamour Woman of the Year and was included in Time magazine's 100 Most Influential People of 2018. She is the recipient of the 2021 Abraham Kuyper Prize for Excellence in Reformed Theology and Public Life.

Early life 
Denhollander was born on December 8, 1984, in Kalamazoo, Michigan, to Paul and Camille Moxon. She was homeschooled and practiced gymnastics at a local club. In 2004, she coached gymnastics. She began law school at Oak Brook College of Law and Government Policy when she was 19.

Advocacy 

Denhollander told the MSU Police Department in August 2016, filed a Title IX complaint with the university and then shared her story of sexual abuse with the Indianapolis Star. Denhollander said Nassar sexually assaulted her when she was a 15-year-old gymnast and sought treatment from him for lower back pain.

Denhollander came forward 16 years after Nassar first abused her, which led to a floodgate of hundreds of other women who came forward with similar allegations against him. At least seven other young women told someone about Nassar over a twenty-year period before Denhollander did likewise, but her complaint was the first to gain traction. Nassar initially denied the accusations, then admitted guilt in a plea agreement and now is imprisoned for the rest of his life. Before he was sentenced, more than 200 women gave testimonies about his abuse in two courtrooms over nine days in county courtrooms near Lansing. Denhollander was the last to speak during both of Nassar's sentencing hearings.

In asking the judges to impose the maximum sentence on Nassar, Denhollander said, "How much is a little girl worth?" She answered her own question: "These victims are worth everything ... I plead with you to impose the maximum sentence under the plea agreement because everything is what these survivors are worth." In Ingham County, Judge Rosemarie Aquilina said Denhollander "built an army of survivors" and called her "a five-star general." Aquilina also said Denhollander was "the bravest person I have ever had in my courtroom."

Denhollander has been bestowed with many honors for bringing Nassar to justice, including Time magazine naming her to its 2018 list of the world's 100 Most Influential People. On May 16, 2018 it was announced that the survivors of the USA Gymnastics sexual abuse scandal would be awarded the Arthur Ashe Courage Award. On December 12, 2018, Denhollander was announced as the winner of Sports Illustrated's Inspiration of the Year Award.

Denhollander said that she left her former church in Louisville, Kentucky over her concerns about their affiliation with Sovereign Grace Churches. Even though her church had never been affiliated with Sovereign Grace Churches, the leadership of her former church, Immanuel Baptist Church, issued an apology for not properly addressing Denhollander's concerns, saying their initial response had been "sinfully unloving."

In March 2019, Denhollander announced that she would be publishing two books – a memoir titled What Is a Girl Worth? and a children's book titled How Much Is a Little Girl Worth?. In September 2019, Tyndale published these books, plus a third, Discover Your True Worth.

Personal life 
In 2006, Denhollander met her husband, Jacob. They have four children together: Jonathan, Annaliese, Ellianna and Elora. Elora was given the middle name of Renee to honor Michigan State University Det. Lt. Andrea Renee Munford, "who fought for us and made redeeming so much evil, possible."

The Denhollanders live in Louisville, Kentucky, and are members of the Reformed Baptist Church of Louisville. Jacob is a student at Southern Baptist Theological Seminary.

References

External links
 Rachael Denhollander, Official Website
 My Larry Nassar Testimony Went Viral. But There’s More to the Gospel Than Forgiveness., ChristianityToday.com

Living people
American social activists
American female artistic gymnasts
People from Louisville, Kentucky
1984 births
Michigan lawyers
People from Kalamazoo, Michigan
American writers
21st-century American women